The Frankfurter Kranz (or Frankfurt Crown Cake) is a cake specialty of Frankfurt am Main, Germany.

Preparation starts with the baking of a firm sponge cake in a ring shaped baking tin. The cake is then sliced horizontally to divide it into two or three rings, and thick layers of buttercream icing are placed between the rings, usually with a layer of red jam (typically strawberry, blackcurrant or cherry jam). The outside of the cake is then thickly coated with more buttercream and topped with caramel-covered brittle nuts, called Krokant, toasted almond flakes and/or ground hazelnuts. Krokant is signature to this dish. 

Frankfurter Kranz is considered a reminiscence of Frankfurt as the coronation city of the Holy Roman emperors. Its round shape and the sheath of brittle are intended to represent a golden crown, the cherries should be reminiscent of rubies. 

After World War II, in the absence of butter, the surface of the cake was often coated with Kogel mogel (sweetened egg yolk paste), and other types of decoration may involve dots made from (more) buttercream or cocktail cherries.

See also
 List of German desserts

References

External links

German cakes
Hessian cuisine
Layer cakes
Nut dishes
Sponge cakes
Foods with jam